The Child and Family Services Review Board (CFSRB; French: Commission de révision des services à l'enfance et à la famille) is an independent, quasi-judicial agency in Ontario, Canada. It is one of 13 adjudicative tribunals under the Ministry of the Attorney General that make up Tribunals Ontario. The CFSRB is responsible for reviewing and hearing issues that involve children, youth, and families in Ontario.

Authority

The CFSRB conducts hearings and appeals mandated under the Education Act, Child, Youth and Family Services Act, and Intercountry Adoption Act. Under these three acts, the CFSRB resolves complaints and disputes regarding children’s aid societies, emergency secure treatment, crown ward removal, refusal of adoption, and expulsion from school boards

References

External links
Child and Family Services Review Board (CFSRB)
Ontario Laws

Ontario government tribunals